Master of Men is a 1933 American pre-Code drama film directed by Lambert Hillyer and starring Jack Holt, Fay Wray and Walter Connolly. It was produced and distributed by Columbia Pictures.

Synopsis
An aspirational steel mill worker fights his way up to become a Wall Street financier. His wife disapproves of his stock market schemes, and when he loses large amounts of money they go to live in the country.

Cast
 Jack Holt as Buck Garrett 
 Fay Wray as Kay Walling 
 Walter Connolly as Sam Parker 
 Berton Churchill as Mr. Walling 
 Theodore von Eltz as Grenaker

References

Bibliography
 Roy Kinnard & Tony Crnkovich. The Films of Fay Wray. McFarland, 2015.

External links
 

1933 films
1933 drama films
American drama films
Films directed by Lambert Hillyer
Columbia Pictures films
American black-and-white films
1930s English-language films
1930s American films